Gabriel Contino, better known as Gabriel o Pensador (Portuguese for "Gabriel the Thinker") is a Brazilian rapper, writer, and composer known for his conscious lyrics which speak of activism, and issues of race, politics, social problems, and the Catholic church. Gabriel began his music career when he launched a demo tape containing the song  "Tô Feliz (Matei o Presidente)" I'm Happy (I killed the President) landing him a contract with Sony Music. Since then he has released eight albums: Ainda É Só o Começo, Quebra-Cabeça, Nádegas a Declarar, Gabriel o Pensador, Seja Você Mesmo (mas não Seja sempre o Mesmo), MTV ao Vivo, Cavaleiro Andante and Sem Crise (this last one was released independently). Gabriel has also written three books: "Diário Noturno", "Um Garoto Chamado Rorbeto" and "Meu Pequeno Rubro-Negro". "Um Garoto Chamado Rorbeto" won the "Prêmio Jabuti", for best Children's literature.

Biography
Coming from a middle-class family, a unique background among Brazilian rappers, Gabriel, the son of a well known journalist in Brazil, hit fame in 1992 with the song "Tô Feliz (Matei o Presidente)" ("I'm happy, I've killed the president"), the debut single from his first and eponymous album. This song was written in protest of President Fernando Collor de Mello and his corrupt administration. Gabriel's mother was Collor's press secretary. The same album also yielded other hits, including "Lôrabúrra" ("Dumb Blonde", shortened) and "Retrato de um Playboy" ("Portrait of a Playboy"), bringing hip hop mainstream attention in Brazil by catering to the middle class. Although rapping about everyday life, Gabriel also found time to talk about social injustices with his fourth single, "O Resto do Mundo" ("The Leftovers of the World", a pun on the word for "leftovers" and "rest" being the same in Portuguese), a more downbeat track about homeless life, with a purposefully depressive melody and flow. Gabriel was "notorious for his biting attacks on some of the major ills of Brazilian society: poverty, racism, violence."

His following albums were also commercially successful, with a careful blend of socially relevant tracks mixed with airwave-minded pop anthems. His third album, Quebra-Cabeça, was released in 1997 and sold over one million copies. History-minded, Gabriel was highly influenced by other Brazilian music, including bossa nova, samba and MPB, as well as using hip hop's traditional methods of sampling jazz, funk and disco ("2345meia78", for example, sampled Chic's "Good Times").

In 1994, while touring in Portugal, Gabriel's song "Lavagem Cerebral" (Brainwashing) was received with much praise. The piece was accepted as "a strong social critique of Brazilian society and of the ideology of the dominating classes."

Besides his native Brazil, Gabriel, o Pensador is also well known in other Lusophone countries such as Portugal, Angola, Cape Verde, Mozambique, and has worked with Portuguese musicians like Sérgio Godinho and General D. In 2004, he recorded his first song in English entitled, Who's The Enemy?, that appeared on American rapper Ithaka's album, Fishdaddy Flashbacks.

Other projects
The musician has also released three books: "Diário Noturno" (Brazil and Portugal; poems and short stories), "Um garoto chamado Rorbeto" (Brazil; fiction poetry for children) "Meu Pequeno Rubro-Negro" (Brazil; about children who support Flamengo, like himself). He has been a juror on the spelling bee contest "Soletrando" (in its second edition) on the program Caldeirão do Huck. 
The organization offers tutoring and courses for a group of underprivileged children in the Rocinha district, located in Gabriel's hometown of Rio de Janeiro, where he still lives in today. Gabriel is also a member of the Dreams Can Be Foundation, a nonprofit charitable supporting organization and a Brazilian NGO dedicated to aiding street children and impoverished youth in Brazil, working in partnership with local organizations and NGOs to provide: education, moral and social development, humanitarian relief, and the offering of opportunities where there were none before.

Discography
Studio Albums

Live Albums

Compilations

Singles

Other Songs

References

External links
Gabriel o Pensador official site
Gabriel's Myspace page
Gabriel's Instagram page

1974 births
Living people
Brazilian rappers
Brazilian male writers
Brazilian people of Italian descent
Portuguese-language writers
Musicians from Rio de Janeiro (city)
Brazilian musicians